Fresco is a painting technique.

Fresco may also refer to:

Adobe Fresco, digital painting software
Fresco (surname)
"Fresco", the NATO reporting name for the Soviet Mikoyan-Gurevich MiG-17 and Polish PZL-Mielec Lim-6
Fresco (Stockhausen), a 1969 orchestral composition by Karlheinz Stockhausen
Fresco (Lindberg), a 1997 orchestral composition by Magnus Lindberg
Fresco (web browser) a proprietary, embedded web browser for RISC OS and embedded platforms
The Fresco, a 2000 book by Sheri S. Tepper
Fresco (board game), 2010 game
Fresco (M People album), 1997
Fresco (Jerry Rivera album), 1996
Fresco EP, a 1983 EP by Icehouse
Fresco, Côte d'Ivoire

See also
Fresca, a brand of soft drink
Al fresco dining